Júlia Gonçalves de Almeida (born 5 January 1983) is a Brazilian actress.

Biography
Julia Almeida is an actress born in Rio de Janeiro, and the daughter of the writer Manoel Carlos. She is best known for her solid television career at Rede Globo.

In 2001, Julia moved to New York City to study acting at the Lee Strasberg Theatre and Film Institute, and directing at the New York Film Academy.

In late 2006, Almeida returned to Brazil to shoot Duas Caras, in which she played the seductive character Fernanda. The actress has played several roles including the headstrong cinematographer Leinha in Caminho das Índias. The character was noted for making the boho chic trend popular in Brazil.

In December 2011, Almeida launched the global lifestyle and fashion online magazine, The Mark Magazine, with husband Sebastian Bailey.

Almeida divides her time between Rio de Janeiro, New York and London.

Career
Júlia Almeida started her acting career in 1991, in the Rede Globo telenovela Felicidade. She played Duda in the 1995 telenovela História de Amor. Almeida participated in three other telenovelas, Por Amor in 1997, Laços de Família in 2000, and Mulheres Apaixonadas in 2003. Almeida played Luísa in the 2001 miniseries Presença de Anita. She participated in the 2004 miniseries Um Só Coração, and in the 2006 miniseries JK, both by Maria Adelaide Amaral. Almeida played the journalist Helô Machado in JK. In Duas Caras, in 2007, she played the role of a seductive character named Fernanda. In 2009, Almeida played an aspiring cineaste named Leinha in India – A Love Story. Almeida played the role of Lorena in the 2011 Rede Globo telenovela A Vida da Gente.

Filmography

References

External links
 

Living people
1983 births
Actresses from Rio de Janeiro (city)
Brazilian telenovela actresses
20th-century Brazilian actresses
21st-century Brazilian actresses